Fusheini Hudu Angulu is a Ghanaian linguist and specialist in Dagbani language phonology. He lectures at the University of Ghana department of Linguistics.

Publications

References

Living people
Linguists from Ghana
Year of birth missing (living people)
Place of birth missing (living people)
University of British Columbia alumni
University of Alberta alumni
University of Ghana alumni
Academic staff of the University of Ghana
Linguists of Dagbani